Hora Svatého Šebestiána is a municipality and village in Chomutov District in the Ústí nad Labem Region of the Czech Republic. It has about 300 inhabitants.

Administrative parts
The village of Nová Ves is an administrative part of Hora Svatého Šebestiána.

History
The first written mention of Hora Svatého Šebestiána is from 1558.

References

Villages in Chomutov District
Villages in the Ore Mountains